Sadek Boukhalfa (25 August 1934 – 3 July 2009) was an Algerian international footballer who played as a midfielder.

International career
Boukhalfa made his only appearance for the Algerian National Team on 23 February 1963 in a friendly against Czechoslovakia in Algiers. Algeria won the game 4–0 with Boukhalfa scoring the third goal of the game.

References

1934 births
2009 deaths
People from Skikda Province
Association football midfielders
Algerian footballers
Algeria international footballers
Ligue 1 players
Ligue 2 players
Expatriate footballers in France
FC Metz players
FC Nantes players
SC Bastia players
AS Béziers Hérault (football) players
Stade Poitevin FC players
Blois Football 41 players
21st-century Algerian people